The Aalto Centre is an urban area milieu in the city of , in the Finnish Lapland, designed by the renowned Finnish architect Alvar Aalto, comprising the city's key administrative and cultural buildings.

Background
Up to 90% of Rovaniemi's building stock was destroyed during the Lapland War by the retreating German forces, necessitating the rebuilding of the city centre. In January 1945,  commissioned a new urban design from the Finnish Association of Architects rebuilding unit, with the design work headed by Alvar Aalto.

Aalto's eventual design, approved in 1946, is called  , and incorporates five arterial roads forming the shape of a reindeer antler. In 1960, when  was granted its city charter, the formal decision was made to implement Aalto's plan.

At the centre of the design, the complex of Aalto-designed public and administrative buildings is known as 'Aalto Centre'.

The complex has been designated and protected by the Finnish Heritage Agency as a nationally important built cultural environment.

Key buildings
Notable Aalto-designed buildings in the centre include:
Lappia Hall performing arts and conference venue (completed in stages, 1961-1975)
Central library (1965)
City hall (1986)

The park surrounding the Aalto Centre also forms an integral part of the milieu.

See also
Aalto Centre, Seinäjoki

References

External links
'Alvar Aalto Rovaniemellä', City of Rovaniemi publication outlining Aalto's designs (in Finnish)
'Aalto and the Post-war Rebuilding of Rovaniemi', on Alvar Aalto Foundation website

Alvar Aalto buildings
Modernist architecture in Finland
Rovaniemi
Buildings and structures in Lapland (Finland)